José Antonio Camacho Alfaro (born 8 June 1955) is a Spanish former football left-back and manager.

He spent 15 professional years at Real Madrid, appearing in more than 500 official matches with the team and helping win 19 major titles, including nine La Liga championships. Subsequently, he embarked in a lengthy manager career, which included two very brief spells with his main club.

Camacho earned more than 80 caps with Spain, representing the country in two World Cups and as many European Championships. He also managed the national team for four years, taking them to the quarter-finals in the 2002 World Cup.

Club career
Camacho was born in Cieza, Murcia. After playing youth football at Albacete Balompié he moved to La Liga giants Real Madrid at age 18, being almost immediately cast into the first team and its starting XI, his debut being handed by manager Luis Molowny on 3 March 1974 as he played the full 90 minutes in a 1–0 away loss against CD Málaga.

During his spell with Real Madrid, Camacho appeared in nearly 600 official matches (414 in the league alone), forming a proficient left-wing partnership with Rafael Gordillo, who featured mainly as a midfielder. In January 1978 he suffered a serious injury in training, which put his career on hold for nearly two years, but returned strong, being instrumental as the capital side won consecutive UEFA Cups.

International career
Camacho played 81 games for the Spain national team, making his first appearance just 19 years old. His debut came on 5 February 1975 in a 1–1 draw against Scotland for the UEFA Euro 1976 qualifiers, in Valencia.

For the following 13 years, Camacho was a defensive mainstay for the national side, being selected – and always as first-choice – to the 1982 and 1986 FIFA World Cups, as well as Euro 1984 and 1988. After the 2–0 group stage loss to West Germany in the latter competition, he retired from the international scene aged 33.

Coaching career

Beginnings
Following his retirement as a player in 1989, Camacho began coaching, first in Real Madrid's coaching staff. His first professional experiences were spent at Rayo Vallecano and RCD Espanyol, both of which he helped promote to the top division.

In the summer of 1998, Camacho took over Real Madrid's first team, but left after only 22 days over disagreements with the club's management.

Spain national team
Camacho succeeded Javier Clemente as national team manager in September 1998, after a shock 3–2 loss in Cyprus in a Euro 2000 qualifier. The tide quickly turned under the new boss, who led the side to the final stages where they bowed out to eventual champions France in the quarter-finals.

Two years later, Camacho's team lost in the same stages to South Korea, now in the 2002 World Cup. Following the controversial defeat he announced his resignation, being replaced by Iñaki Sáez.

Benfica
Camacho returned to club action subsequently, being appointed at S.L. Benfica from Portugal on 1 December 2002 in the place of sacked Jesualdo Ferreira. Two years later, his team won the Taça de Portugal against José Mourinho-led FC Porto in extra-time, as well as finishing second in the Primeira Liga.

A tough tackler in his playing days, Camacho also showed a human side when he cried profusely after Miklós Fehér died on the pitch, shortly after entering Benfica's match at Vitória de Guimarães.

Real Madrid and Benfica return
For the 2004–05 season, Camacho returned to Real Madrid on a two-year contract as a replacement to sacked Carlos Queiroz. However, things quickly went wrong again in his second spell after a 3–0 defeat at Bayer Leverkusen in the group stage of the UEFA Champions League, and a 1–0 league loss at Espanyol four days later also in September; shortly after, he resigned and was replaced by assistant Mariano García Remón.

Following Fernando Santos' mutual agreement termination of contract with Benfica, after a 1–1 away draw with Leixões S.C. in 2007–08 Portuguese League's opener, Camacho returned to Benfica. However, following a poor string of results, and claiming he was no longer able to motivate the team, he announced he would leave the club minutes after drawing a home match against bottom-placed U.D. Leiria on 9 March 2008.

Osasuna
After working as co-commentator on Spanish TV network Cuatro during Spain's victorious Euro 2008 campaign (he would also work for the channel during the 2010 World Cup, which ended with the national team's triumph as well), Camacho replaced José Ángel Ziganda at the helm of CA Osasuna on 13 October 2008.

On 14 February 2011, following a 1–0 away loss against Real Sociedad that placed the Navarrese inside the relegation zone, Camacho was fired. They eventually finished in ninth position.

China national team
On 13 August 2011, Camacho took over the reins of the Chinese national team, signing a three-year deal for a reported annual salary of US$8 million. The Chinese Football Association head Wei Di explained the decision as being part of a long-term plan to help the country catch up with Japan and South Korea, while Chinese Soccer Administrative Centre vice-president Yu Hongchen said that Camacho would keep his job even if he did not qualify for the 2014 FIFA World Cup.

China failed to qualify for the World Cup, after only finishing third in the third qualifying round with three wins and three losses. Camacho was also in charge as a Chinese young squad lost 8–0 to Brazil on 10 September 2012 in a friendly match, the national team's worst-ever defeat which also meant the drop to an all-time low 109th position in the FIFA World Rankings.

In the first game of the 2015 AFC Asian Cup qualification campaign, Camacho and China lost 1–2 against Saudi Arabia. Following a 5–1 shock friendly loss to Thailand on 15 June 2013, he was relieved of his duties.

One reason cited for Camacho's shortcomings in Asia was the limitation of football boots. The Chinese FA ordered that all the national team players were to wear Adidas, whilst most players in the Chinese Super League wore Nike, thus creating discomfort.

Gabon national team
Camacho was appointed as Gabon manager 43 days before the start of the 2017 Africa Cup of Nations which was to take place in that country, replacing Jorge Costa. The team exited in the group stage, with three draws.

Camacho was relieved of his duties on 12 September 2018, due to poor results.

Managerial statistics

Honours

Player
Real Madrid
La Liga: 1974–75, 1975–76, 1977–78, 1978–79, 1979–80, 1985–86, 1986–87, 1987–88, 1988–89
Copa del Rey: 1973–74, 1974–75, 1979–80, 1981–82, 1988–89
Supercopa de España: 1988, 1989
Copa de la Liga: 1985
UEFA Cup: 1984–85, 1985–86

Spain
UEFA European Championship runner-up: 1984

Manager
Benfica
Taça de Portugal: 2003–04

See also
 List of La Liga players (400+ appearances)
 List of Real Madrid CF records and statistics

References

External links
 
 
 Real Madrid biography 
 
 
 
 

1955 births
Living people
People from Cieza, Murcia
Footballers from the Region of Murcia
Spanish footballers
Association football defenders
Albacete Balompié players
Real Madrid Castilla footballers
Real Madrid CF players
La Liga players
Tercera División players
UEFA Cup winning players
Spain youth international footballers
Spain amateur international footballers
Spain international footballers
1982 FIFA World Cup players
UEFA Euro 1984 players
1986 FIFA World Cup players
UEFA Euro 1988 players
Spanish football managers
Rayo Vallecano managers
RCD Espanyol managers
Sevilla FC managers
Real Madrid CF managers
CA Osasuna managers
S.L. Benfica managers
La Liga managers
Segunda División managers
Primeira Liga managers
Spain national football team managers
China national football team managers
Gabon national football team managers
UEFA Euro 2000 managers
2002 FIFA World Cup managers
2017 Africa Cup of Nations managers
Spanish expatriate football managers
Spanish expatriate sportspeople in Portugal
Spanish expatriate sportspeople in China
Expatriate football managers in Portugal
Expatriate football managers in China
Expatriate football managers in Gabon
Spanish expatriate sportspeople in Gabon